Province 9 (IX) is one of nine ecclesiastical provinces making up the Episcopal Church in the United States of America. It comprises seven dioceses in Latin America and the Caribbean. Julio Cesar Holguin Khoury of the Diocese of the Dominican Republic serves as president and Victor Scantlebury of the Diocese of Central Ecuador serves as vice president.

Dioceses of Province IX

Colombia (Bogotá)
Dominican Republic 
Central Ecuador
Litoral Ecuador (Guayaquil) 
Honduras (San Pedro Sula)
Puerto Rico
Venezuela (Caracas)

References and external links 

Ecclesiastical provinces of the Episcopal Church in the United States of America